SM UC-49 was a German Type UC II minelaying submarine or U-boat in the German Imperial Navy during World War I. The U-boat was ordered on 20 November 1915 and was launched on 7 November 1916. She was commissioned into the German Imperial Navy on 2 December 1916 as SM UC-49. In 13 patrols UC-49 was credited with sinking 26 ships, either by torpedo or by mines laid. UC-49 was sunk by mine off coast of Flanders on 14 August 1918.

Design
A German Type UC II submarine, UC-49 had a displacement of  when at the surface and  while submerged. The submarine was powered by two six-cylinder four-stroke diesel engines each producing  (a total of ), two electric motors producing , and two propeller shafts.

UC-49 was fitted with six  mine tubes, eighteen UC 200 mines, three  torpedo tubes (one on the stern and two on the bow), seven torpedoes, and one  Uk L/30 deck gun. Her complement was twenty-six crew members.

Summary of raiding history

References

Notes

Citations

Bibliography

 
 

Ships built in Kiel
German Type UC II submarines
U-boats commissioned in 1916
Maritime incidents in 1918
U-boats sunk in 1918
U-boats sunk by British warships
U-boats sunk by depth charges
World War I minelayers of Germany
World War I shipwrecks in the English Channel
World War I submarines of Germany
1916 ships
Ships lost with all hands